The fourteenth season of Big Brother Suomi premiered on 5 September 2021 and lasted for 12 weeks. It was aired on Nelonen with a 24/7 live feed on Ruutu.fi streaming service.

Elina Kottonen was the host of the main show. The Daily Show was co-hosted by Kimmo Vehviläinen and Alma Hätönen.

The Big Brother house is located at the same place in Vantaa as in the previous VIP season.

Housemates

Nominations table 
The first housemate in each box was nominated for two points, and the second housemate was nominated for one point.

Notes 
 : No nominations. Housemates have divided to four groups by themselves. Housemates decided together which group is saved from nominations. The green group was saved. Later the green team had to decide which group will be nominated this week. They chose the yellow team.
 : Taavi won blinded dance marathon (10h 45min) and saved himself from eviction and put Katja instead.
 : All housemates faced the audience's vote. The Housemates with the most votes were saved, and the bottom 2 faced the vote of the 7 housemates with the most votes from the public.
 : New housemates Maiju, Noora and Samir decided five housemates to be nominated. They were allowed to discuss with each other about the decision. Two housemates were evicted this week.
 : Housemates were divided to two groups having competitions. Blue group won and thus were not nominated for eviction. Anssi won a nomination competition and saved red team members Pekka and Ville.
 : Red/Blue division remains.  Only the winning team (red) did nominations.
 : Minna was not able to nominate and she was not able to get nominated, but she gave her nomination points to Jasmiina.
 : Minna's temporary revisiting time ended and she left house at day 60.
 : At week 11 evictions are made on Wednesday, Friday and Sunday.
 : There was time bomb in the house. When it exploded (Monday 2PM) bomb holder (Ville) got nominated.
 : Nomination competitions. Jasmiina, Taavi and Pekka lost and got nominated.
 : Nomination competition. Anssi, Lasse, Samir and Taavi lost and got nominated.

Nominations points received

References

External links 

 Official website
 Big Brother Suomi at Ruutu.fi

14
2021 Finnish television seasons